Robert William Kastenmeier (January 24, 1924March 20, 2015) was an American Democratic politician who represented central Wisconsin in the United States House of Representatives for 32 years, from 1959 until 1991.  He was a key sponsor of the Copyright Act of 1976 and the Electronic Communications Privacy Act of 1986.

Early life
Kastenmeier was born in Beaver Dam, Dodge County, Wisconsin, where he attended public school.  After graduating from Beaver Dam High School, he enlisted in the United States Army for duty in World War II.  He was on his way to the Pacific Theater as a 2nd Lieutenant when the war ended in 1945.  He was discharged from the Army on August 15, 1946, with the rank of 1st Lieutenant, but opted to remain in the Philippines until 1948, working as a branch office director handling war claims for the United States War Department.

After returning to the United States, he continued his education at Carleton College, in Northfield, Minnesota, and at the University of Wisconsin Law School, where he received his LL.B. in 1952. After being admitted to the state bar, he began the practice of law in Watertown, Wisconsin.

Political career
In 1955, Kastenmeier was elected justice of the peace for Jefferson and Dodge Counties, and he served until 1959.

Kastenmeier made an unsuccessful bid for Congress in Wisconsin's 2nd congressional district in 1956, losing to Republican Donald Tewes by 11 points. In a rematch in 1958 he defeated Tewes by 6,200 votes, and became the first Democrat to hold the seat in 28 years.  He won a third race with Tewes in 1960, and faced another close contest in 1962. However, he romped to a fourth term in 1964 and was re-elected with comfortable majorities twelve more times over the next 24 years, serving from the 86th United States Congress to the 101st.

As a congressman, Kastenmeier was skeptical of American military intervention overseas, and was an early opponent of the Vietnam War, coming out in opposition in 1965.

Kastenmeier was a member of the House Judiciary Committee for almost his entire congressional career.  In this capacity, he played a key role in the impeachment process against President Richard Nixon, asserting that each article of impeachment should be voted on separately in order to have a complete debate on each issue.

Kastenmeier was also Chairman of the Judiciary Subcommittee on Courts, Intellectual Property, and the Administration of Justice from 1969 until he left office.  From this role, he worked as a key sponsor of the Copyright Act of 1976—the first major overhaul of American copyright law since 1909.  The law remains the foundation of the modern American copyright law.

Kastenmeier was also active for many years in attempting to advance privacy laws, sponsoring or introducing 26 such bills between 1973 and 1991 to expand protections on communications privacy, financial privacy, rights of privacy from video surveillance, and confidentiality of medical records, among other topics.  His efforts culminated in the successful passage of the Electronic Communications Privacy Act of 1986, which expanded government wiretap restrictions to mobile phones and electronic mail.

Also in 1986, Kastenmeier was one of the impeachment managers appointed by the House in 1986 to prosecute the case in the impeachment trial of Harry E. Claiborne, a judge of the United States District Court for the District of Nevada who had been convicted of tax crimes but refused to resign his seat. Kastenmeier helped to frame the impeachment resolution against Claiborne which ultimately resulted in his conviction in the United States Senate and removal from office.

In 1990, Kastenmeier unexpectedly lost his re-election bid to Republican Scott Klug, a former television anchor who was nearly 30 years his junior.  After leaving Congress, Kastenmeier served briefly on a judicial reform commission before retiring.

Legacy
Kastenmeier lived in Sun Prairie, Wisconsin, and then Arlington, Virginia, where he died on March 20, 2015.  A week before his death in 2015, in an interview with Madison's Capital Times, Kastenmeier warned of American overseas interventions, saying, "There are far too many trouble spots in the world. And we must always remember what history has taught us, that it's always very easy to get in, but terribly hard to get out."  In eulogizing his former colleague, Congressman Dave Obey said of Kastenmeier, "I never saw him cast a vote for political reasons. I never saw him cast a vote that was contrary to his beliefs."

The Robert W. Kastenmeier United States Courthouse in Madison, Wisconsin, one of the courthouses of the United States District Court for the Western District of Wisconsin, was named in his honor.

Electoral history

References

Further reading
 Borders, Rebecca and C. C. Dockery. "You Can't Go Home Again: Bob Kastenmeier". In Beyond the Hill. New York: University Press of America, 1995, pp. 41–44.
 Kidwell, John A. "Congressman Robert Kastenmeier and Professor John Stedman: A Thirty-five Year Relationship". Law and Contemporary Problems, vol. 55, no. 2: 129–137.
 Patterson, L. Ray and David Lange. Copyright and Legislation: The Kastenmeier Years. Durham, N.C.: Duke University School of Law, 1992.
 Remington, Michael J. "Robert W. Kastenmeier: Copyright Legislator par Excellence". Law and Contemporary Problems, vol. 55, no. 2: 297–310.

External links

 
 Robert W. Kastenmeier U.S. Courthouse
 

1924 births
2015 deaths
Politicians from Beaver Dam, Wisconsin
People from Arlington County, Virginia
Carleton College alumni
Wisconsin state court judges
United States Army officers
Military personnel from Wisconsin
University of Wisconsin Law School alumni
Democratic Party members of the United States House of Representatives from Wisconsin
20th-century American politicians
People from Watertown, Wisconsin
People from Sun Prairie, Wisconsin
20th-century American judges
United States Army personnel of World War II